Kari Chisholm (born July 2, 1973) is an American political consultant and sports commentator based in Portland, Oregon. He became known for commentary on the Heisman Trophy, and his now-defunct site StiffArmTrophy.com correctly predicted the winner of the trophy every year from 2002 to 2012. He is the co-founder and publisher of BlueOregon, a defunct blog.

Career

Political consultancy and BlueOregon
In 2004, Chisholm, Jeff Alworth, and Jesse Cornett co-founded BlueOregon, a progressive blog that covered the politics of the U.S. state of Oregon. Chisholm  was one of the site's three main editors and was described as the "den mother of the political blog" by the Willamette Week. Chrisholm stated that he and other tech-savvy activists wanted smaller regional political blogs like BlueOregon to play as a prominent a role at the state level as large blogs already did at the national level. 

By 2006 the site was the top-read Oregon political blog, with 3,000 to 4,000 readers a day around election season. An article in The Register-Guard stated that "[b]logs such as Chisholm's have been a place where Democratic activists have been able to find out where and how they can help their party's candidates. [...] And where those willing to get up from their computers can go to make phone calls or go door-knocking on behalf of candidates." 

By 2008 the site was generating 9,000 page views a day and editors were credentialed for floor access to the 2008 Democratic National Convention in Denver, Colorado. By 2010, the site featured more than 30 regular contributors, and Chrisholm and other editors were regularly quoted in local political stories by The Oregonian, the state's largest newspaper.
 
During this period of growth for BlueOregon, Chirsholm served as a political consultant and operated website development company Mandate Media, which provided digital services to U.S. Senator Ron Wyden and Gov. Ted Kulongowski, and to the campaigns of then-U.S. Senate candidate Jeff Merkley, then-secretary of state candidate Kate Brown, then-congressional candidate Kurt Schrader, and then-Portland mayoral candidate Sam Adams. In 2008, Jake Weigler, a BlueOregon contributor and campaign manager for Senate candidate Steve Novick, published a post on the site alleging that BlueOregon's coverage of the race was biased towards the Merkley campaign and that Chrisholm had a clear conflict of interest. "It's pretty transparent that [BlueOregon] is being used as window dressing and as a mouthpiece for the Merkley campaign," Weigler told The Oregonian. 

Other campaigns expressed similar complaints about coverage, and reporting in the Willamette Week detailed "ample evidence" that BlueOregon has "posted pieces that portray Chisholm's paying clients favorably." "I'm not a journalist and don't pretend to be," Chrisholm later told the paper, "but I work hard to get all voices out there."

Between 2006 and 2011, Chisholm was paid nearly $400,000 by state and local Democratic candidates.

Chrisholm last posted on BlueOregon in 2020, and the site has not been updated since. 

In 2023 Chisholm was selected to serve on a committee to draft the district lines which would form the geographic basis of Portland's new form of government.

College football commentary
Chisholm is known as a leading commentator on the Heisman Trophy, the award given annually to the most outstanding college football player. His site, Stiff Arm Trophy, correctly projected the winner of each Heisman contest for twelve consecutive years. Chisholm's projections have been referenced on ESPN and in Sports Illustrated.

Personal life 
He lives in Portland, Oregon with his wife and their son.

References

External links
Stiff Arm Trophy - publisher

1973 births
Living people
American political writers
Lewis & Clark College people
University of Southern California alumni
Writers from Portland, Oregon
People from Lake Oswego, Oregon
Lake Oswego High School alumni